Luis Rodrigo Vieira is a Brazilian football player.

References

Living people
Year of birth missing (living people)
Brazilian footballers
Association footballers not categorized by position